The Stride Bank Center is an arena in downtown Enid, Oklahoma.

About

Arena construction began May 2011. It opened on June 15, 2013 with the Greater Enid Chamber of Commerce Business Expo. The building was designed by Convergence Design and constructed by Key Construction as part of the Enid Renaissance project, a $24 million project which includes the renovation of Convention Hall and the addition of 1,100 additional parking spaces in the downtown area. The former Geronimo Motor Company building is one of a few buildings that was torn down for parking accommodations.

Name changes
Enid Event Center & Convention Hall (June 15, 2013—June 13, 2016)
Central National Bank Center (June 14, 2016—March 21, 2019)
Stride Bank Center (March 22, 2019—present)

Noted performers

Alabama
Alan Jackson
Amy Grant
The Beach Boys
Celtic Thunder
Darius Rucker
Gabriel Iglesias
Gary Allan
Goo Goo Dolls
Justin Moore
Kenny Rogers
Lee Brice
Little Big Town
Lonestar
Martina McBride
MercyMe
Night Ranger
Pat Benatar
Reba McEntire
Rodney Atkins
Ronnie Milsap
Styx
Vince Gill
"Weird Al" Yankovic
Willie Nelson
3 Doors Down

References

Buildings and structures in Enid, Oklahoma
Indoor arenas in Oklahoma
Basketball venues in Oklahoma
Tourist attractions in Enid, Oklahoma
Sports venues completed in 2013
2013 establishments in Oklahoma